"Canadian Summer" is a song written and recorded by Canadian country music artist Dean Brody. It was released in June 2020 through Brody’s label, Scurvy Dog Music.

Background
In an interview with Global News, Brody remarked that "It’s kind of a nostalgic song for me. I wrote it thinking that it would come out in the fall but I think during the summer is kind of cool, especially now with us having to be inside for so long with COVID. With being Canadians, we already have a long winter as it is. This song just celebrates what makes our summers unique. There’s a little bit of Canadiana thrown in there and I’m hoping people love it. We had a lot of fun recording it and bringing it to life".

Critical reception
Courtney Fielder of Country100 Moose Jaw called the track a "fantastic tune", while FYI Music News labelled the song a "slam dunk hit".

Commercial performance
"Canadian Summer" peaked at number 56 on the Canadian Hot 100 for the week of September 26, 2020. It was a Number One hit on the Billboard Canada Country chart for the same week, marking Brody's fifth number one. It also set the record as the most played song ever at Canadian country radio in a single week on the Nielsen BDS charts with 1817 spins, breaking the record that he previously set with "Can't Help Myself" earlier in 2020. The song has been certified Platinum by Music Canada.

Charts

Certifications

References

2020 songs
2020 singles
Dean Brody songs
Songs about Canada
Songs written by Dean Brody